Luis Arcos Bergnes also known as Carmita is a small town and a ward (consejo popular) in Camajuani, Villa Clara, Cuba. With a population of 2,279 it is considered a village.

Nearby towns of Carmita are La Luz, Corona, El Cubano, Romano, La Mano, and Vega Alta.

Geography
Wards of Cuba are a local body of a town and some towns nearby. Towns in Luis Arcos Bergnes’ ward include
 La Luz
 Fusté
 Crucero Carmita

Economy
According at the DMPF of Camajuani, Luis Arcos Bergnes is a settlement linked to sources of employment or economic development. 

In order to make charcoal in Camajuani you need to live in Luis Arcos Bergnes or Taguayabón.

Education 
In the ward there are a few schools, these include: 

 Luis A. Bergnes Primary
 Julio Pino Primary (Crucero Carmita)
 Delfín Sen Cedré Primary (La Luz)

References 

Populated places in Villa Clara Province